Park Gun-hyung (born November 1, 1977) is a South Korean actor. Park made his acting debut in musical theatre in 2001 and has since been active on both television and stage. He starred in the ballroom dancing film Innocent Steps (2005), the period drama The Kingdom of the Winds (2008), as well as played doctors in medical drama Syndrome, and romantic comedy I Do, I Do (2012).

Filmography

Film

Television

Variety show

Theater
Something Rotten (2020)
Taxi Driver (2015)
December (2013-2014)
The Scarlet Pimpernel (2013)
Hedwig and the Angry Inch (2012)
Zorro (2011-2012)
The Sorrows of Young Werther (2010)
Mozart! (2010)
Fool for Love (2010)
The Wedding Singer (2009-2010)
The Three Musketeers (2009)
I Am Sam (2008)
Hamlet: The Rock Opera (2008-2009)
The Beautiful Game (2007-2008)
Go! Go! Beach (2004)
Saturday Night Fever (2003-2004)
Singin' in the Rain (2002-2003)
The Rehearsal (2002)
The Play (2001)

Awards and nominations

References

External links
  
 
 
 

1977 births
Living people
South Korean male television actors
South Korean male film actors
South Korean male musical theatre actors
South Korean male stage actors
Seoul Institute of the Arts alumni
People from Seoul